The Benefit of Clergy Act 1575 (18 Eliz. I c.7), long title An Act to take away clergy from the offenders in rape and burglary, and an order for the delivery of clerks convict without purgation, was an Act of Parliament of the Parliament of England enacted during the reign of Elizabeth I.

It provided that if any person was found guilty of rape or burglary, they would suffer the death penalty as normal in felony cases, without being permitted the benefit of clergy.

The Act was repealed by section 1 of the Offences against the Person Act 1828 and section 125 of the Criminal Law (India) Act 1828.

References
Select statutes and other constitutional documents illustrative of the reigns of Elizabeth and James I, ed. by G. W. Prothero. Oxford University Press, 1913. Fourth edition.
Chronological table of the statutes; HMSO, London. 1993.

1575 in law
1575 in England
Acts of the Parliament of England concerning religion
Christianity and law in the 16th century
Repealed English legislation